Kaminski or Kamiński (feminine: Kamińska; plural: Kamińscy) is a surname of Polish origin. It is the sixth most common surname in Poland (95,816 people in 2009,  94,829 in 2020).

It is related to the following surnames in other languages:

People
 Aleksander Kamiński (1903–1978), Polish teacher and soldier
 Anatoliy Kaminski (born 1950), Ukrainian politician
 Anna Kamińska (born 1983), Polish mountain bike orienteer
 Bożena Kamińska (born 1965), Polish politician
 Bronislav Kaminski (1899–1944), Russian Nazi collaborator
 Ester Rachel Kamińska (1870–1925), Polish Jewish actress
 Ewa Kamińska-Eichler (born 1953), Polish sprint canoer
 Franciszek Kamiński (1902–2000), Polish general
 Georgij Kaminski (born 1960), Russian glider pilot
 Heinrich Kaminski (1886–1946), German composer
 Heinz Kaminski (1921–2002), German chemical engineer and space researcher
 Ida Kamińska (1899–1980), actress and director, daughter of Ester
 Jakub Kamiński, Polish footballer
 Janusz Kamiński (born 1959), Polish cinematographer
 Julia Kamińska (born 1987), Polish actress
 Łukasz Kamiński (born 1973), Polish historian
 Kevin Kaminski (born 1969), Canadian ice hockey player
 Krzysztof Kamiński, Polish footballer
 Krzysztof Kamiński (judoka), Polish judoka
 Larry Kaminski (born 1949), American football player
 Marcin Kamiński (born 1992), Polish footballer
 Marcin Kamiński (chess player), Polish chess player
 Marek Kamiński (born 1964), Polish polar explorer
 Mariusz Kamiński (born 1965), Polish politician
 Mateusz Kamiński (born 1991), Polish canoeist
 Mel Brooks (born Melvin James Kaminsky; 1926), American actor, comedian, film producer, director and screenwriter
 Michał Kamiński (born 1972), Polish politician
 Mik Kaminski (born 1951), British musician
 Ralph Kaminski (born 1990), Polish singer-songwriter
 Romuald Kamiński (born 1955), Polish Roman Catholic priest
 Shera Danese nee Kaminski (born 1949), American actress
 Thomas Kaminski (born 1992), Belgian footballer
 Vincent Kaminski, American energy industry executive
 Waldemar Kaminski (1917–2006), American philanthropist
 Wojciech Kamiński (born 1974), Polish basketball coach
 Wojciech Kamiński (footballer), Polish footballer
 Zygmunt Kamiński (1933–2010), Polish bishop
 Zygmunt Kamiński (painter), Polish painter

Fictional characters

 Mark Kaminski, in Raw Deal, 1986 movie. 
 Diese Kaminskis, German TV series about three brothers
 Natalia Kamiński in Fate/Zero by Gen Urobuchi
 Manuel Kaminski in Me and Kaminski by Daniel Kehlmann

See also

References

Polish-language surnames